Leandro Ricardo Vieira (born 3 April 1979) is a former Brazilian footballer. He spent most of his career at Brazilian lower division, but made a successful career with Swiss club FC Thun, where he played at 2005–06 UEFA Champions League.

Leandro Vieira spent 2003 season with Coritiba, played once in national league A. In 2004 season he left for Malutrom then signed by J2 League side Kyoto Purple Sanga. In 2005 season he was signed by Veranópolis for 2005 Campeonato Gaúcho. In July 2005, along with countryman Adriano Pimenta, Tiago Bernardini and Adriano Spadoto were joined Swiss Super League side FC Thun, which he played all 6 group stage matches of 2005–06 UEFA Champions League as starter. The small Swiss club reached its highest peak in European competitions that season, eventually losing to Hamburger SV in 2005–06 UEFA Cup round of 32.

He left the club in 2006. In 2007–08 season he was signed by Czech club Teplice but for its B team. He was injured in October 2008.

References

External links

 CBF 
 Futpedia 

Brazilian footballers
Brazilian expatriate footballers
Swiss Super League players
Coritiba Foot Ball Club players
Deportivo Pasto footballers
J. Malucelli Futebol players
FC Thun players
FK Teplice players
Association football fullbacks
Expatriate footballers in Colombia
Expatriate footballers in Switzerland
Expatriate footballers in the Czech Republic
Expatriate footballers in Japan
Brazilian expatriate sportspeople in Colombia
Brazilian expatriate sportspeople in Switzerland
Brazilian expatriate sportspeople in the Czech Republic
J2 League players
Kyoto Sanga FC players
Footballers from São Paulo (state)
1979 births
Living people